Néstor Alvarado (1912 – 17 October 1983) was an Argentine equestrian. He competed in two events at the 1948 Summer Olympics.

References

External links

1912 births
1983 deaths
Argentine male equestrians
Olympic equestrians of Argentina
Equestrians at the 1948 Summer Olympics
Place of birth missing